Eran Biton (born 16 January 1996) is an Israeli footballer who plays as a central midfielder. He currently plays for Beitar Tel Aviv Bat Yam.

Early life
Biton was born in Ramat Gan, Israel, to a family of Sephardic Jewish descent.

Honours

Club
Maccabi Haifa
Israel State Cup: 2015–16

Maccabi Sha'arayim
Toto Cup Leumit: 2016–17

References

 Profile page in Maccabi Haifa website

1996 births
Living people
Israeli Jews
Israeli footballers
Maccabi Haifa F.C. players
Maccabi Sha'arayim F.C. players
Hapoel Afula F.C. players
Beitar Tel Aviv Bat Yam F.C. players
Hapoel Ashkelon F.C. players
Hapoel Acre F.C. players
Hapoel Ra'anana A.F.C. players
Israeli Premier League players
Liga Leumit players
Footballers from Ramat Gan
Israeli people of Moroccan-Jewish descent
Association football midfielders